The Treib–Seelisberg railway (TSB) is a funicular railway in the canton of Uri, Switzerland. The line links Treib, on Lake Lucerne, with Seelisberg on the mountain 330 m above. At Treib the funicular connects with regular passenger boats of the Schifffahrtsgesellschaft des Vierwaldstättersees, which connect it to Lucerne and other lakeside communities.

The line was granted its concession in 1910, with construction starting in 1914 and the line was opened in 1916. The current cars were supplied in 1965 and refurbished in 1992, whilst the control system was replaced in 1996.

Operation 
The line has the following specifications:

See also 
 List of funicular railways
 List of funiculars in Switzerland

References

External links 
 
 Treib-Seelisberg-Bahn web page
 Video presentation on the Treib-Seelisberg-Bahn

Funicular railways in Switzerland
Transport in the canton of Uri
Railway lines opened in 1916
Metre gauge railways in Switzerland